Acoloithus is a genus of moths of the family Zygaenidae.

Species
 Acoloithus falsarius Clemens, 1860
 Acoloithus novaricus Barnes & McDunnough, 1913
 Acoloithus rectarius Dyar, 1898

References
 Acoloithus at Markku Savela's Lepidoptera and some other life forms
 Bugguide.net. Species Acoloithus falsarius - Clemens' False Skeletonizer - Hodges#4629

Procridinae
Zygaenidae genera